Eichheim may refer to:

Henry Eichheim (1870–1942), American composer, conductor, violinist, organologist, and ethnomusicologist
Josef Eichheim (1888–1945), German film actor